Worcestershire County Cricket Club are an English cricket club based in Worcester, Worcestershire.  The club was founded in 1865 and played their first first-class cricket match in 1899 after being accepted into the County Championship. The club have played both List A cricket and Twenty20 cricket since their introductions into the English game in 1963 and 2003 respectively.

Key
 Years denotes the years in which the player was named as official club captain for Worcestershire.
 First denotes the date of the first match in which the player captained Worcestershire.
 Last denotes the date of the last match in which the player captained Worcestershire.
 FC denotes the number of first-class matches in which the player captained Worcestershire.
 LA denotes the number of List A matches in which the player captained Worcestershire.
 T20 denotes the number of Twenty20 matches in which the player captained Worcestershire.
 Total denotes the total number of first-class, List A and Twenty20 matches in which the player captained Worcestershire.

Official captains

Unofficial captains
This is a list of players who have captained Worcestershire without having been appointed official club captain.

See also
 List of Worcestershire County Cricket Club players

References
General

Specific

Worcestershire
cricket
Captains
Worcestershire County Cricket Club